Hildegard Schaeder (13 April 1902 – 11 April 1984) was a German theologian and church historian. In her research, she focused on the history and theology of Eastern orthodox churches, with studies not only in Breslau and Hamburg but also in Prague and the Soviet Union where she lived when the Nazis came to power.

In 1934, she returned to Germany, where she worked for the Prussian Privy State Archives, became a member of the Confessing Church and worked in Martin Niemöller parish in Dahlem, caring for persecuted Jews. She was imprisoned from 1943. After the liberation of Ravensbrück concentration camp, she moved to Göttingen, working at the university, and then to Frankfurt where she worked for the Protestant church in Germany (EKD) responsible for Eastern churches, and taught at the university from 1962 to 1978. In 2000, she was posthumously honoured as Righteous Among the Nations.

Life 
Born in Kiel, Schaeder was the fourth child of the professor of systematic theology Erich Schaeder and his wife Anna née Sellschopp (1867–1948). She had three brothers; Hans Heinrich Schaeder became an orientalist, Reinhard Schaeder an economist, and Johann Albrecht Schaeder a physicist and brain researcher. She attended a private school first in Kiel and later, after her father had accepted a call from the Silesian Friedrich Wilhelm University, in Breslau, where she achieved the Abitur as an external student in 1920. She studied classical and slavic philology, Eastern European history, Byzantine studies and philosophy at the University of Breslau and the University of Hamburg. At the University of Hamburg, she received her doctorate in 1927 supervised by Richard Salomon with the dissertation "Moskau, das dritte Rom – Studien zur Geschichte der politischen Theorien in der slavischen Welt". After further studies in Prague and the Soviet Union, she returned to Germany in 1934.

She studied at the Kirchliche Hochschule für reformatorische Theologie which Niemöller had initiated in 1935, and which was run illegally after being banned immediately. A focus of her parish work was the care of Jews who had been deported to the Lublin Ghetto. She also explored hiding places for persecuted Jews in Berlin and supplied food and clothes to those in hiding. After a denunciation, Schaeder was taken into protective custody (Schutzhaft) on 14 September 1943 for "favouring fugitive Jews".

She then worked in a parish in Mecklenburg, but moved to Göttingen, where her mother and siblings already lived after World War II. She was head of the group for Eastern Orthodox Churches at the University of Göttingen. From 1948 to 1970, she worked for the Protestant church in Germany (EKD) based in Frankfurt, as an Oberkirchenrätin responsible for Eastern churches. She also taught at the Johann Wolfgang Goethe-Universität in Frankfurt from 1962, as an honorary professor for the history of the Eastern Churches from 1965 to 1978.

Schaeder died in Freiburg im Breisgau at the age of 81.

Honours 
 In 1978 she was awarded the Order of Merit of the Federal Republic of Germany
 Schaeder was awarded – posthumously – as "Righteous Among the Nations" in April 2000
 A street in the Oberrad district of Frankfurt is named after Schaeder

Publications 
 Moskau, das dritte Rom – Studien zur Geschichte der politischen Theorien in der slavischen Welt; Hamburg; 1929
 Die dritte Koalition und die Heilige Allianz – Nach neuen Quellen; Königsberg, Berlin; 1934
 Ostern im KZ; Berlin; 1947
 Russische Kirche und östl. Christentum. With contributions from Hildegard Schaeder, Ludolf Müller, Robert Schneider. Tübingen 1949
 Autokratie und Heilige Allianz; Darmstadt, 1963
 Impulse für die evangelisch-orthodoxe Begegnung. Ausgewählte Schriften von 1949 bis 1972, edited by Karl Pinggéra, Jennifer Wasmuth and Christian Weise. Mit einer biographischen Hinführung von Gisa Bauer; Münster 2016 (Forum Orthodoxe Theologie; 17)

Further reading 
 Martin Rohkrämer: Kirchliche Ost-West-Begegnungen zwischen 1952 und 1959. In Willy Brandt, Helmut Gollwitzer, Johann Friedrich Henschel (ed.): Ein Richter, ein Bürger, ein Christ. Festschrift für Helmut Simon. Baden-Baden 1987, (Schaeder ).
 : Leben gegen den Tod – Hildegard Schaeder: Ostern im KZ. Evangelischer Regionalverband, Frankfurt, 1995, .
  
 : "Versöhnung durch Begegnung. Hildegard Schaeder als Osteuropahistorikerin, bekennende Christin und Ökumenikerin." In Hildegard Schaeder, Impulse für die evangelisch-orthodoxe Begegnung, ausgewählte Schriften von 1949 bis 1972; Münster 2016, 5–73.
 Sabine Arend / Hans-Christian Petersen, Art. Schaeder, Hildegard, in Handbuch der völkischen Wissenschaften. Berlin, Boston 2nd edition 2017, .

References

External links 
 

20th-century German historians
Women historians
People in Christian ecumenism
German Righteous Among the Nations
Ravensbrück concentration camp survivors
Academic staff of Goethe University Frankfurt
Recipients of the Cross of the Order of Merit of the Federal Republic of Germany
1902 births
1984 deaths
Writers from Kiel
20th-century German women writers